Todd Stashwick is an American actor and writer. He is known for his roles as Dale Malloy on The Riches and Deacon on 12 Monkeys.

Early life and career
After performing at several local improvisational theaters, he was hired to tour with The Second City across the US. Following productions at The Second City Detroit and The Second City Northwest, he relocated to New York. He auditioned for Saturday Night Live the same year that fellow Second City alumnus David Koechner joined the cast.

Work in film and television drew him to Los Angeles, where he shot several pilots and series including recurring work on the series MDs, American Dreams, Rodney and Still Standing. He had a significant supporting role on The Riches playing Minnie Driver's nefarious cousin until its cancellation in September 2008.

In May 2018, it was announced he was cast as Dr. Drakken in the Disney Channel film Kim Possible, based on the animated series. The film premiered on February 15, 2019.

In September 2020, Stashwick appeared as a guest on the Studio 60 on the Sunset Strip marathon fundraiser episode of The George Lucas Talk Show.

Writing

Stashwick is also the co-creator, along with DC and Marvel artist Dennis Calero of the online web comic Devil Inside, which had its launch at the 2010 San Diego Comic-Con. He and Calero met because Dennis had illustrated Todd's character from Heroes into an online comic based on the series. The two decided to collaborate on their own title which is being self-published once a week in traditional serialized strip form on Stashwick's personal website.

Devil Inside tells "the story of Jack Springheel. aka The Devil, who has a crisis of conscience. He blasts out of hell and lands in the Nevada desert. He does not want to go back, he wants to quit. But there are forces conspiring to drag him back to hell. If he doesn't use his mojo he stays off the grid and they can't find him. But he is the Devil after all and old habits die hard, not using his powers proves more difficult than he thought. A man caught between what he is and what he wants to be. He's trying to stay one step ahead of his adversaries."

Stashwick and Calero are in development with the Syfy channel with their pilot Clandestine. The two will develop and write the pilot script for the swashbuckling space adventure drama. They will also serve as co-executive producers. John Shiban will serve as script supervisor.

Stashwick and Amy Hennig co-wrote a video game set in the Star Wars universe for Electronic Arts and Visceral Games. It was later announced that the project was cancelled.

Filmography

Film

Television

Video games

References

External links

Todd Stashwick Official Website archive link via Wayback Machine
Interview Todd Stashwick with www.mycoven.com October 2013

Living people
20th-century American male actors
21st-century American male actors
American male comedians
American male film actors
American male stage actors
American male television actors
Year of birth missing (living people)